Selaru is an island in Indonesia

Selaru or Şelaru may refer to:

Selaru language, an Austronesian language of Selaru and Yamdena in Indonesia
Selaru languages, a pair of Austronesian languages spoken in Indonesia
Șelaru, Dâmbovița, a commune in Dâmboviţa County in southern Romania

People
Aurel Șelaru (born 1935), a Romanian Olympic cyclist